Baskin Run is a  long tributary to South Branch French Creek in Erie County, Pennsylvania and is classed as a 1st order stream on the EPA waters geoviewer site.

Course
Baskin Run rises in Wayne Township of Erie County, Pennsylvania then flows south to meet South Branch French Creek west of Lovell, Pennsylvania.

Watershed
Baskin Run drains  of Erie Drift Plain (glacial geology).  The watershed receives an average of 47.4 in/year of precipitation and has a wetness index of 427.64.

References

Rivers of Pennsylvania
Rivers of Erie County, Pennsylvania